Shaanxi Province was a province of the Yuan dynasty governed from Xi'an (Known at the time as Fengyuan (奉元), Anxi (安西, "Peaceful West"), and Jingzhao (京兆)) It was established in 1260. In 1294, Sichuan Province (Yuan dynasty) was split off from Shaanxi.

The Yuan-era Shaanxi province included the majority of present-day Shaanxi Province, the south-western part of Inner Mongolia, south-eastern Gansu (around Qingyuan), north-western Sichuan, and a small part of Qinghai.

During the Northern Song dynasty it was mostly part of the Yongxing Jun, capital also at Xi'an. Following the Jin-Song Wars, the Jurchen-led Jin dynasty established rule over the northern part of area, establishing Jingzhao Fu, Qingyuan, and Xiqin.

In 2015 a Yuan-era tomb fresco was excavated in Luogetai village, Gao town, Hengshan county, Yulin city in Shaanxi province.

References

External links
 The Historical Map of Shaanxi Province in the Yuan Dynasty

Provinces of the Yuan dynasty